Patriarch Joachim (January 6, 1620 – March 17, 1690) was the eleventh Patriarch of Moscow and All Russia, an opponent of the Raskol (the Old Believer schism), and a founder of the Slavic Greek Latin Academy.

Born  Ivan Petrovich Savelov (Иван Петрович Савелов) also in some other sources as  Ivan Petrovich Savyolov, Joachim was of noble origin. When his family died in the 1654 epidemic, he became a monk and served in various monasteries, receiving the religious name Joachim upon his tonsure.

In 1664, Joachim was elevated to the rank of archimandrite and became hegumen (abbot) of the Chudov Monastery and in 1672 was consecrated as Metropolitan of Novgorod.  He was elected a Patriarch on July 26, 1674, following the death of Patriarch Pitirim. Although Joachim had participated in the council which deposed Patriarch Nikon, he continued Nikon's policies with regard to the Old Believers, and defending church authorities against the encroachments of Caesaropapism by the Tsars.

In 1686, he made an agreement with Bulgarian Rostislav Stratimirovic to aid in a revolt against the Ottomans. Patriarch Joachim also participated in, and directly supported the transfer of the Jurisdiction of the Metropolitanate of Kyiv from the Patriarchate of Constantinople to the Patriarchate of Moscow.

Footnotes

Works
Увет духовный
Слово поучительное

External links
The Testament of Patriarch Joachim
 Патриарх Московский и всея Руси Иоаким (Савелов)

Metropolitans and Patriarchs of Moscow
Russian nobility
1620 births
1690 deaths
17th-century Russian people
Archimandrites
17th-century Eastern Orthodox bishops
Russian bishops